Déborah Sananes (born 26 October 1995) is a French athlete, specialising in the sprinting events.

She was born in Treichville, Ivory Coast. Running for club EA Bourg-en-Bresse, Sananes became the youth champion of France in the 400 metres in 2012 and junior champion of France in 2013.

She won the title for 200 meters at the 2014 Indoor French championships in 23.91 seconds

International competitions

National titles
 French Indoor Athletics Championships
200 metres: 2014

Personal records

References

External links
 
 
 
 

1995 births
Living people
French female sprinters
Ivorian female sprinters
Ivorian emigrants to France
French Athletics Championships winners
Athletes (track and field) at the 2018 Mediterranean Games
Sportspeople from Abidjan
Sportspeople from Bourg-en-Bresse
Mediterranean Games competitors for France